Moskva is the name of several rural localities in Russia:
Moskva, Kirov Oblast, a village under the administrative jurisdiction of Verkhoshizhemye Urban-Type Settlement in Verkhoshizhemsky District of Kirov Oblast; 
Moskva, Pskov Oblast, a village in Porkhovsky District of Pskov Oblast
Moskva, Tver Oblast, a village in Voroshilovskoye Rural Settlement of Penovsky District in Tver Oblast